The 1994–95 North Carolina Tar Heels men's basketball team represented University of North Carolina. The head coach was Dean Smith. The team played its home games in Chapel Hill, North Carolina, and was a member of the Atlantic Coast Conference.

Roster

NCAA basketball tournament
Southeast
North Carolina 80, Murray State 70
North Carolina 73, Iowa State 51
North Carolina 74, Georgetown 64
 North Carolina 74, Kentucky 61
Final Four
Arkansas 75, North Carolina 68

Awards and honors
 Jerry Stackhouse, First Team, 1995 NCAA Men's Basketball All-Americans
 Rasheed Wallace, Second Team, 1995 NCAA Men's Basketball All-Americans

Team players drafted into the NBA

References

External links 

North Carolina
North Carolina Tar Heels men's basketball seasons
NCAA Division I men's basketball tournament Final Four seasons
Tar
Tar
North Carolina